The Italian ambassador in Nicosia is the official representative of the Government in Rome to the Government of Cyprus.

List of representatives 
<onlyinclude>

References 

 
Cyprus
Italy